Ferma vedetelor ( English: Celebrity farm) is the current Romanian version of the reality television show The Farm based on the Swedish television series of the same name that was originally created in 2001 by Strix and produced in association with Sony Entertainment and Endemol. The series premiered on March 9, 2015 on Pro TV.

The show is based on a group of celebrities living together twenty-four hours a day in a Farm, isolated from the outside world (primarily from mass media, such as newspapers, telephones, television and the internet) while having all their steps followed by cameras around-the-clock, with no privacy for three months.

The contestants compete for the chance to win the grand prize by avoiding weekly eviction, until the last celebrity remains at the end of the season that can claim the grand prize. The show was presented by Iulia Vântur, Monica Bîrlădeanu and now is presented by Mihaela Rădulescu and Cristi Bozgan

Format
Twelve contestants are cut out from outside world. Each week one contestant is selected the Farmer of the Week. In the first week, the contestants choose the Farmer. Since week 2, the Farmer is chosen by the contestant evicted in the previous week.

Nomination Process
The Farmer of the Week nominates two people (a man and a woman) as the Buttlers. The others must decide, which Buttler is the first to go to the Battle. That person than choose the second person 
(from the same sex) for the Battle and also the type of battle (a quiz, extrusion, endurance, sleight). The Battle winner must win two duels. The Battle loser is evicted from the game.

Season 1

Contestants 
(ages stated are at time of contest)

Nominations

Summary
On Day 1, twelve celebrities arrived at the Farm in three groups. At the end of the first day, Mioara became the first Farmer of the Week. On Day 2, Mioara chose to nominate Oana and Tudorel as Buttlers. Because of medical problem, Tudorel was removed from the competition and he was replaced by Dima, who became the new Buttler.

The game

The Eliminated contestants voted for the person who took the fifth place: 
- Ionuţ (8 votes: Oana, Lucian, Corina, Dima, Doiniţa, Roxana, Gina, Cristina) 
- Vica (3 votes: Tudorel, Mioara, Ştefan) 
- Augustin, Dan, George (0 votes)

Ratings

Official ratings are taken from ARMA (Asociaţia Română pentru Măsurarea Audienţelor). the organisation that compiles audience measurement and television ratings in Romania.

References

Pro TV original programming
2010s Romanian television series
The Farm (franchise)
Celebrity reality television series
Romanian reality television series